The Denmark national under-21 football team has played since 1976 and is controlled by the Danish Football Association. Before 1976, the age limit was 23 years.

Tournament record

UEFA European U-21 Championship

*Draws include knockout matches decided on penalty kicks.
**Gold background colour indicates that the tournament was won.***Red border color indicates tournament was held on home soil.Summer Olympics

UEFA European Under-21 Championship
2023 UEFA European Under-21 Championship qualification

2023 UEFA European Under-21 Championship play-offs 

The four play-off winners qualify for the final tournament.

All times are CEST (UTC+2), as listed by UEFA (local times, if different, are in parentheses).

|}

Recent results and forthcoming fixtures

2021

Results in 2021

2022
Results in 2022

Current squad
The following players were called up for the 2023 UEFA European Under-21 Championship qualification play-offs games against Croatia on 23 and 27 September 2022.Caps and goals as of 14 September 2022 after the games against Kazakhstan, Scotland and TurkeyMost appearances
Because of the age restriction, a player can't be in the team for very long and the most promising young players spend little time with the under-21 team before making their senior national team debut.

Note: Club(s) represents the permanent clubs during the player's time in the under-21 national team. Players in bold have played at least one game for the senior Danish national team.

Most goals

Note: Club(s)'' represents the permanent clubs represented in the games in which the player's scored for the under-21 national team. Players in bold have played at least one game for the senior Danish national team.

Managers
 1959–1966: Ivan Jessen
 1967–1967: Erik Dennung
 1968–1969: Ejnar Olsen
 1970–1970: Henry From
 1971–1973: Kaj Christensen
 1974–1974: Ejnar Olsen
 1976–1980: Tommy Troelsen
 1980–1989: Richard Møller Nielsen
 1989–1992: Viggo Jensen
 1992–1999: Jan B. Poulsen
 2000–2006: Flemming Serritslev
 2006–2011: Keld Bordinggaard
 2011–2013: Morten Wieghorst
 2013–2015: Jess Thorup
 2015–2019: Niels Frederiksen
 2019–2021: Albert Capellas
 2021–2023: Jesper Sørensen
 2023–: Steffen Højer

See also
 European Under-21 Football Championship 2006
 Denmark national under-17 football team
 Denmark national football team

References

External links
UEFA Under-21 website
DBU Under-21 website

European national under-21 association football teams
under-21